The women's 400 metres hurdles event at the 1983 Pan American Games was held in Caracas, Venezuela on 23 and 24 August. This was the first time that the event was held at the Games.

Medalists

Results

Heats

Final

References

Athletics at the 1983 Pan American Games
1983